Woodmont station is a  former railroad station in Huntingdon Valley, Pennsylvania. It was located on Byberry Road and Reading Way in Lower Moreland Township, Pennsylvania. It formerly served the Reading Railroad's Newtown Line.

History
Woodmont station was an early closure on the Newtown line, with trains bypassing the stop by the late 1960s. All traces of the former Woodmont station were removed by the 1970s. The Newtown line itself became a part of SEPTA's Fox Chase Rapid Transit Line, which ceased operation on January 14, 1983, due to failing diesel train equipment.

References

External links
Newtown Line.pa-tec.org – PA-TEC study on resuming SEPTA commuter service between Fox Chase and Newtown
Woodmont, Pennsylvania website

Railway stations closed in 1966
Former Reading Company stations
Former railway stations in Montgomery County, Pennsylvania